Gregory Scott Aldering (born 1960), also known simply as Greg Aldering is an American astronomer, discoverer of minor planets and supernovae, currently with the University of California, Lawrence Berkeley Laboratory.

As a high school student in Bridgeport, Michigan, he was an avid amateur astronomer and showed a particular aptitude for scientific studies in his studies of variable stars. Currently, his interests center on cosmology, including measurement of the cosmological parameters, the exploration of the nature of the "dark energy" and the large-scale distribution of matter in the universe. His current cosmological studies focus on the use of Type Ia supernovae as tools for determining the cosmological parameters, through his participation in the Supernova Cosmology Project. He is now the primary investigator of the Nearby Supernova Factory experiment, and is also a co-investigator on the Supernova/Acceleration Probe.

While an undergraduate student at the Massachusetts Institute of Technology (1979–1983), he discovered four asteroids at Kitt Peak National Observatory (695), as credited by the Minor Planet Center. He has so far classified some 266 supernovae, and is one of the co-discoverers of SN 2002bk.

The minor main-belt asteroid 26533 Aldering was named in his honor.

References

External links 
 Personal home page

1962 births
20th-century  American astronomers
Discoverers of asteroids

Living people
Massachusetts Institute of Technology School of Science alumni
University of California, Berkeley faculty